Praphulladatta Goswami (1919-1994) was an Assamese author of more than 46 novels, including Shesh Kot (Where Does It End, 1948) and Kesa Pator Kapani (The Trembling of New Leaves, 1952).

References

External links

1919 births
1994 deaths
Indian writers